Sucinoptinus is a genus of fossil beetles belonging to the family Ptinidae.

The species of this genus are found in Central Europe.

Species:
 Sucinoptinus brevipennis Bellés & Perkovsky, 2016 
 Sucinoptinus bukejsi Alekseev, 2012

References

Ptinidae